Manny Michel is a American football coach. He has served as a defensive coordinator and defensive line coach during his career.

Playing career
Michel played [[college football at Tennessee Tech University and is an alumnus of the university.

Coaching career

High school career
Michel began his coaching career in 1985 as an assistant football coach at Cumberland County High School in Crossville, Tennessee. He was an assistant coach at his alma mater, John Curtis Christian High School in River Ridge, Louisiana from 1986 to 1994.

College career
Michel began his college coaching career at Nicholls State University as defensive coordinator and defensive line coach from 1995 to 1998. From 1999 to 2008, Michel became defensive line coach at the University of Louisiana-Monroe and became co-defensive coordinator along with Phil Elmassian in 2008. At ULM, Michel worked under head coaches Bobby Keasler, Mike Collins and Charlie Weatherbie. Starting with the 2009 season, Michel moved to McNeese State University as the defensive line coach and stayed at McNeese State through 2015. Michel returned to the University of Louisiana–Monroe as defensive line coach in 2016 and stayed in that role until retiring after the 2017 season. In 2020, Michel came out of retirement and took a position as assistant defensive line coach and defensive analyst at LSU.

References

1960 births
Living people
Louisiana–Monroe Warhawks football coaches
LSU Tigers football coaches
McNeese Cowboys football coaches
Nicholls Colonels football coaches
Tennessee Tech Golden Eagles football players
High school football coaches in Louisiana
High school football coaches in Tennessee
People from Metairie, Louisiana
Coaches of American football from Louisiana
Players of American football from Louisiana